Thung Song Junction railway station is a railway station located in Pak Phraek Subdistrict, Thung Song District, Nakhon Si Thammarat. This station is the junction for the Southern Line mainline and the Kantang Branch Line to Trang Province. On site, there is a 277 class decommissioned steam locomotive, built by Hanomag.

The station opened in January 1914, on the Southern Line section Huai Yot–Thung Song Junction. In October 1914, the line extended southwards to Phatthalung, and in February 1915, the line extended northbound to Ban Na.

Train services 
 International express train No. 35 / 36 Bangkok–Butterworth–Bangkok
 Thaksin special express train No. 37 / 38 Bangkok–Sungai Kolok–Bangkok
 Diesel rail special express train No. 41 / 42 Bangkok–Yala–Bangkok
 Express train No. 83 / 84 Bangkok–Trang–Bangkok
 Express train No. 85 / 86 Bangkok–Nakhon Si Thammarat–Bangkok
 Rapid train No. 167 / 168 Bangkok–Kantang - Bangkok
 Rapid train No. 169 / 170 Bangkok–Yala–Bangkok
 Rapid train No. 171 / 172 Bangkok–Sungai Kolok–Bangkok
 Rapid train No. 173 / 174 Bangkok–Nakhon Si Thammarat–Bangkok
 Local train No. 445 / 446 Chumphon–Hat Yai–Chumphon
 Local train No. 447 / 448 Surat Thani–Sungai Kolok–Surat Thani

References 
 
 
 

Railway stations in Thailand
Railway stations opened in 1914